Javier Frana and Leonardo Lavalle were the defending champions but lost in the first round to Luis Lobo and Javier Sánchez.

Donald Johnson and Francisco Montana won in the final 6–2, 6–4 against Nicolás Pereira and Emilio Sánchez.

Seeds

  Luis Lobo /  Javier Sánchez (quarterfinals)
  Nicolás Pereira /  Emilio Sánchez (final)
  Karel Nováček /  Jiří Novák (quarterfinals)
  Jose Antonio Conde /  Nuno Marques (first round)

Draw

References
 1996 Abierto Mexicano de Tenis Doubles Draw

1996 ATP Tour